Parkdale-Belvedere was a provincial electoral district for the Legislative Assembly of Prince Edward Island, Canada. It was created before the 1996 election out of the dual-member 5th Queens riding. It was abolished prior to the 2007 election into Charlottetown-Sherwood and Charlottetown-Parkdale.

Members
The riding has elected the following Members of the Legislative Assembly:

Election results

Plebiscites

References

Politics of Charlottetown
Former provincial electoral districts of Prince Edward Island